Burger is a white wine grape of French origin, today planted primarily in the Central Valley. Its French name is Monbadon.

In the early history of Californian wine, Burger was a majority variety but its influence has steadily decreased and now it is used primarily in bulk jug wine production.

Synonyms
Burger is also known under the synonyms Aouba, Auba, Berger, Blanc de Cadillac, Burger, Cadillac, Caoba, Castillone à Montendre,
Frontignan, Frontignan des Charentes, Grand Blanc, Gros Montils, Meslier d'Orleans, Monbadon, and Ugni de Montpellier.

References

White wine grape varieties